Lagis australis is one of at least ten species of polychaete worms of the family Pectinariidae. It is the only pectinariid species found in New Zealand.

References

 Annelida.net
 Miller M & Batt G, Reef and Beach Life of New Zealand, William Collins (New Zealand) Ltd, Auckland, New Zealand 1973

Terebellida
Worms of New Zealand
Animals described in 1904